Daphne High School is a secondary school located in Daphne, Alabama, United States. The school, which serves grades 9-12, is a part of the Baldwin County Public Schools district. Students who attend the school live in the city of Daphne, its surrounding unincorporated areas, and the city of Loxley. The school's mascot is the Trojan.

As of 2020, the school has approximately 1,400 students and offers the International Baccalaureate program. In 2012, it was listed as a National Blue Ribbon School.

History 
Daphne High School was opened in 1987 with only one main building. Since then, it has had several major additions to its facility. First, There was the addition of a second building on the west end of the school grounds (called the "new wing" by students and alumni). The stadium was then built as part of the school's expanding athletic program. During the summer of 2007, the stadium received new restroom and concession facilities in a multimillion-dollar project. At the same time, Baldwin County Schools purchased a church next door to the school grounds for approx. $4 million, known as Trojan Hall.

Athletics 
Daphne High School is classified as a 6A school by the Alabama High School Athletic Association. Daphne won the state championship game in 2001 and 2010. In 2013, Daphne finished undefeated in region play but were defeated in the first round of the state playoffs.

The Trojans finished the 2001 season ranked #15 in the nation in the National Prep Football Poll. The Trojans baseball program won the 4A state title in 1992, and the 5A title in 1993. In 2001 and 2002 the Trojans won the 6A title.

In 2012, the school was awarded the Alabama High School Athletic Association Sportsmanship Award. The award was one of only 8 given to 6A schools which saw no fines and no ejections from any sport during the year.

Daphne assistant football coach Jacy Todd was honored as the Employee of the Year - large business division in 2013 by the Alabama Governor's Committee on Employment of People with disabilities. Todd was paralyzed from the chest down in an auto accident in 2012. He has returned to full-time teaching and coaching and is often seen on the sidelines in a wheelchair.

Notable alumni
 Ryan Anderson, professional football linebacker
 Jeremy Clark, professional football defensive lineman
 Courtney Duncan, professional baseball player for the Chicago Cubs 
 Omar Shafik Hammami, member and leader in the Islamist militant group Al-Shabaab
 Atlas Herrion, professional football guard for the Houston Texans
 Kenny King, professional football defensive tackle for the Arizona Cardinals; Daphne Trojans head football coach
 Eric Lee, professional football defensive end
 Michael Pierce, professional football defensive tackle
 Patrick White, former quarterback/wide receiver for the Miami Dolphins
 T. J. Yeldon, professional football running back

References

External links

 

Public high schools in Alabama
Schools in Baldwin County, Alabama
Educational institutions established in 1987
International Baccalaureate schools in Alabama
1987 establishments in Alabama